Sam Neuman is a writer for television and films and a songwriter. He was also an attorney-at-law.

Partial filmography 
Hitler (1962)
Buffalo Bill in Tomahawk Territory (1952)
The Hoodlum (1951)
I Killed Geronimo (1950)
 Timber Fury (1950)
Federal Man (1950)
Timber Fury (1950)
Down Missouri Way (1946)
The Enchanted Forest (1945)
Machine Gun Mama (1944)
Dixie Jamboree (1944)
Career Girl (1944)
Hitler – Dead or Alive (1942)

Neuman also wrote for the television shows The New Adventures of Charlie Chan, Perry Mason, The Outer Limits and Hawaii Five-O.

References

External links

American screenwriters
American male songwriters
Possibly living people
Year of birth missing